Abertrinant is a small settlement in Gwynedd, Wales.

External links

www.geograph.co.uk : photos of Abertrinant and surrounding area
Abertrinant at Streetmap.co.uk

Villages in Gwynedd
Dolgoch
Abergynolwyn
Llanfihangel-y-Pennant
Villages in Snowdonia